Bird of prey refers to several species of carnivorous birds. 

Bird of Prey may also refer to:

Aviation
 Boeing Bird of Prey, a black project Boeing aircraft
 Bird of Prey, a specific Boeing EC-135E aircraft

Music

Albums
 Bird of Prey (album), an album by Zozobra

Songs
 "Sunset (Bird of Prey)", a 2000 song by Fatboy Slim
 "Bird of Prey" (Jim Morrison song), a song on the 1995 remastered edition of An American Prayer
 "Bird of Prey" (Uriah Heep song)
 "Bird of Prey", a song by Natalie Prass from Natalie Prass
"Birds of Prey" , a song by Christina Aguilera from her 2010 album Bionic

Television
 Bird of Prey (TV serial), a 1982 BBC drama series starring Richard Griffiths
 "Bird of Prey" (The Batman), an episode of The Batman

Other uses
 Bird of Prey, part of the Batgirl: Year One comic series by DC Comics
 Bird of Prey (Star Trek), a fictional type of spacecraft in the Star Trek universe

See also
 Birds of Prey (disambiguation)
 List of fictional birds of prey
 Preybird, a Star Wars starfighter